Sept morts sur ordonnance (Seven Deaths by Prescription or Bestial Quartet) is a 1975 French drama film directed by Jacques Rouffio and starring  Michel Piccoli, Gérard Depardieu, Jane Birkin, Marina Vlady, Charles Vanel and Valérie Mairesse.

The film was awarded the César Award for Best Editing, and was nominated for Best Film, Best Actor and Best Writing.

Plot 
Pierre Losseray is a surgeon at the public hospital in a small provincial town in France (Clermont-Ferrand). He has recently suffered a heart attack but has returned to work. He is appreciated by his patients, and is being harassed by Old Brézé, the owner of a nearby medical clinic, who is losing clients and cannot stand competition. In league with his sons and son-in-law, Brézé uses insinuations close to blackmail. Losseray also learns about the story of Doctor Jean-Pierre Berg, another surgeon with a very different lifestyle from Losseray, who was similarly hassled by the same man fifteen years before. He becomes obsessed with it as he discovers what it was about.

Berg had killed his three children, his wife and finally himself, apparently when under such pressure; however the real reason of why he did that remains unclear : he had much charisma, a Boston University diploma, an excellent reputation, a charming wife, and was even about to launch his own private clinic. Losseray, though being constantly bugged by Brézé, gets information - sometimes contradictory - by bits and pieces, becomes more and more obsessed with it and the Brézé clan, and finally understands what really happened. He eventually shares the same fate as Berg. Seemingly without concern, the Brézé clan continue with their nefarious activities.

A major role is held by Mathy, a psychiatrist who happens to know, because of his social relations, all the clues about the former story, but gives them reluctantly because he wants to be in good terms with everybody.

Cast 
 Michel Piccoli : Doctor Pierre Losseray
 Gérard Depardieu : Doctor Jean-Pierre Berg
 Jane Birkin : Jane Berg
 Marina Vlady : Muriel Losseray
 Charles Vanel : Old Brézé
 Michel Auclair : Doctor Mathy
 Monique Mélinand : Mrs. Giret
 Coline Serreau : Mrs. Mauvagne
 Antonio Ferrandis : Commissaire Giret
 Georg Marischka : Paul Brézé
 José María Prada : Simon Mauvagne
 Karl Schönböck : Joseph Brézé
 Valérie Mairesse : Mademoiselle Lambert

External links 

1975 films
French drama films
1975 drama films
1970s French-language films
Films directed by Jacques Rouffio
1970s French films